Konjuh is a mountain in the north-east part of Bosnia and Herzegovina. The mountain is bordered by the rivers Seona, Turija, Litva, and Oskova on the north, the river Gostelja and the highway Tuzla–Sarajevo on the north-east. The river Krivaja is located on south and west. With Ozren, Javor and Javornik, Konjuh makes part of a mountain chain which with Trebavac and Majevica presents a transition of the Dinaric mountain system to the spacious Panonian plain.

The average height of this mountain is 1000 meters. Above this height there are tops: Šuplji Javor (1157 m), Vina Kruška (1088 m), Suho Drvlje (1206 m), Zidine (1180m), Brezina (1120 m), Vrh Konjuha (1328 m) and Bandijerka, the top of Javorje (1261 m), Bijeli Vrh (1272 m) and Zečiji Rat (1275 m) on the southwestern comb Smolin.

Flora and fauna 
Konjuh is covered with dense vegetation in conifer which prevails (pine, spruce), beech, maple and in a small number oak. On the mountain grows very rare and curative great yellow gentian – srčanik (Gentiana lutea), which, on this mountain, is protected and endangered.

In the woods of Konjuh there are wild animals like brown bears, roe deer, wild boar, wolves, foxes, squirrels, grouse, and, in the streams and rivers, trout and crayfish. Snakes that live here are horned viper, common vipers, copperheads, and also lizards, green lizards and salamanders.

Cultural and historical monuments 
On the mountain of Konjuh there are many necropolises stećaks, and only in the municipality of Kladanj 500 stećaks are known. There are also ruins of a caravan road which is used for transport of salt from Tuzla, as well as monuments from World War II in Yugoslavia.

Mountain protection 
Hiking associations and nature lovers have been trying for years to convince authorities that part of the mountain is called a protected natural zone. The Government of Tuzla Canton submitted a law for declaring parts of the mountain Konjuh a protected natural zone.

See also
List of mountains in Bosnia and Herzegovina

References

Mountains of Bosnia and Herzegovina